Rainbow Football Club, also known as Rainbow or Rainbow Bamenda, is a Cameroonian football club.

Stadium
Currently the team plays at the 5000 capacity Stade Municipal Mankon.

References

External links
Ogol
Football clubs in Cameroon